Jackson County School District (JCSD) is a school district in Jackson County, Arkansas, headquartered in Tuckerman. It serves Tuckerman, Campbell Station, Grubbs, Swifton, and a portion of Diaz.

It operates Tuckerman Elementary School, Swifton Middle School, and Tuckerman High School. The district's mascot is the bulldog.

It formed on July 1, 1993, due to the merger of the Tuckerman School District and the Grubbs School District. On July 1, 2004, the Swifton School District was merged into the Jackson County School District.

References

Further reading
  (Download) - Includes boundaries of predecessor school districts

External links
 

School districts in Arkansas
Education in Jackson County, Arkansas
1993 establishments in Arkansas
School districts established in 1993